is a former Japanese football player.

Playing career
Hagihara was born in Kagoshima Prefecture on August 6, 1982. After graduating from high school, he joined the J2 League club Vegalta Sendai in 2001. However he did not play much until 2006. He debuted against Juntendo University in the 2007 Emperor's Cup. In 2008, he played in the J2 League against Sanfrecce Hiroshima and won this match 1–0. However he could not play at all in the match from 2009. In 2011, he moved to J2 club Ehime FC. However he did not play much and left the club at the end of the 2011 season. After two years without playing, he joined the Regional Leagues club Blancdieu Hirosaki FC in 2014. He retired at the end of the 2014 season.

Club statistics

References

External links

1982 births
Living people
Association football people from Kagoshima Prefecture
Japanese footballers
J1 League players
J2 League players
Vegalta Sendai players
Ehime FC players
Association football goalkeepers